is a Japanese historical samurai manga series written by Issei Eifuku and illustrated by Taiyō Matsumoto. It was published in Shogakukan's Big Comic Spirits seinen manga magazine, with its chapters collected in eight wideban volumes.

Plot 
Takemitsu Zamurai follows the story of masterless samurai Senō Sōichirō.

Publication
Takemitsuzamurai is written by Issei Eifuku and illustrated by Taiyō Matsumoto. It was serialized in Shogakukan's seinen manga magazine Big Comic Spirits from 2006 to 2010. Shogakukan collected its chapters in eight wideban volumes, released from December 15, 2006, to April 28, 2010.

The manga was licensed in Spain by Glénat.

Volume list

Reception
Takemitsuzamurai won the Excellence Prize in the Manga Division at the 11th Japan Media Arts Festival Awards in 2007. It also won the Grand Prize at the 15th Tezuka Osamu Cultural Prize in 2011. It was nominated for Best Comic at the 2012 Angoulême International Comics Festival.

References

External links

2006 manga
Historical anime and manga
Samurai in anime and manga
Seinen manga
Shogakukan manga
Taiyō Matsumoto
Winner of Tezuka Osamu Cultural Prize (Grand Prize)